Samuel Eells (1810–1842) was a 19th-Century American lawyer, philosopher, essayist and orator who founded the Alpha Delta Phi fraternity in 1832 at Hamilton College in Clinton, New York.

Early life
Eells was born in Westmoreland, New York, in the rural western part of the state, in 1810.  He could trace his family back to early settlers of the Massachusetts Bay Colony, and his father was a Congregationalist missionary who worked amongst the Native Americans in Western New York.  He was educated at home, probably primarily by his mother, before attending the nearby Clinton Academy and finally Hamilton College.

Eells' constitution was feeble, and through all of his short life he struggled with tuberculosis and possibly other illnesses.  Nevertheless, he was known amongst his friends and colleagues for his intense intellectual curiosity, drive, and "personal magnetism."  Besides his praiseworthy writing and oration, he often undertook seemingly impossible projects; for example, before going to Hamilton, in order to improve his health, he traveled on foot from Maryland to Massachusetts, then sailed to Newfoundland and back, paying for his passage by fishing.

Origins of Alpha Delta Phi
Samuel Eells studied at Hamilton College from 1828 to 1832, a time when both the college and American society were in turmoil.  The college was nearly bankrupt due to mismanagement, and the student body was torn apart by rivalries between underground debating and literary societies, primarily the Phoenix and the Philopeuthian.  College life at the time was intensely supervised and instruction was rigidly traditionalist.  Eells saw the virtue of the debating societies as a haven for free thought, association and intellectual cultivation, yet he deplored their vicious competition for members and social dominance.

In 1832, Eells gathered five students to form a new society, Alpha Delta Phi, which would cultivate intellectual debate and development in the manner of the existing literary societies, but put aside their social competitiveness.  It would seek to develop the "entire man," "moral, social and intellectual," and create a community of caring and brotherhood.  In writing the constitution and "ideals" for Alpha Delta Phi, Eells and his cohorts drew on the previously existing debate and literary societies, the few previously existing Greek-letter fraternities such as Sigma Phi and Kappa Alpha, liberal Protestant philosophy, the Enlightenment philosophy and traditions of the Freemasons, and the very early stirrings of Transcendentalist philosophy, which would become very influential later in the 1830s.

Alpha Delta Phi was the second Greek-letter fraternity at Hamilton College, behind Sigma Phi, and as it founded more chapters, it also became the first fraternity at Harvard, Brown University, and several other institutions.  When it founded a chapter at Miami University in Ohio, it became the first Greek-letter fraternity west of the Alleghenies, and the first anywhere outside of New York and New England.

Subsequent career and philosophy
After graduating from Hamilton, Eells moved to Ohio, where his father had already gone in the intervening years. On the way, he had a nearly fatal bout with cholera, but surprised nearly everyone by surviving and recovering. Once in Ohio, he supported himself by teaching at a small school that he founded himself. He studied law on his own, passed the Ohio bar exam, and began practicing on his own in Cincinnati. He prided himself on taking pro bono cases for poor or unpopular clients, and built enough of a reputation for himself that he was taken on as a partner by Salmon P. Chase; Chase was a famous lawyer and jurist who would go on to become a leading abolitionist and a justice of the Supreme Court.

Meanwhile, Eells was delivering noteworthy speeches and orations, especially to meetings of religious and philanthropic organizations, many of which were subsequently reprinted and preserved. His speeches and essays were fervently religious and showed a progressive, optimistic philosophy. He spoke on the value of liberal education, including the study of art and the Classics, on history, and occasionally on controversial social topics. Several of these writings and speeches can be found in the "Memorial of Samuel Eells," collected by his nephew James Eells in 1873 (Cleveland, Oh., Cobb, Andrews & co., 1873).

Probably his most noteworthy work is the "Address to the Biennial Convention of Alpha Delta Phi: On the Law and Means of Social Advancement," delivered and published in 1839. Here, he argues that the general law of human history is progress. Each successive phase of human history brings greater fellowship amongst all humanity and freedom for the individual soul. Although tyranny and suffering may prevail in certain places and times, truth and freedom will always overcome them in the long run. Absolute perfection may never be achieved, but human society will always be pushed forward towards true freedom. He asserts that only spiritual and philosophical change—not material advancement or political reform—can lead to real progress; he cites the mistreatment of the Native Americans as proof that democratic government and law are not enough in themselves to preclude tyranny. Rather, Eells believes that the spread of Christianity around the world will help begin a new era of equality, justice and peace.

While the trust that Eells places in Christian missionaryism may seem naive at best, one must remember that he was raised on a very liberal, humanistic strain of early-nineteenth-century Protestantism. His philosophy is clearly influenced by his family's Congregationalism, by Enlightenment humanism, by Hegel's dialectical philosophy of history, and by the philosophers of Transcendentalism and the Second Great Awakening, such as Ralph Waldo Emerson, Margaret Fuller and Amos Bronson Alcott. Although his idea of unstoppable progress may seem very familiar or cliché today, at that time it was connected to a radical counterculture that was overthrowing conservative beliefs in the continuous decline of humanity.

Last years
After his partnership with Salmon P. Chase, Eells endeavored to practice law on his own again.  This did not last very long, because, as had long been expected, his health began to fall apart.  Eells tried several tactics to try to recover his health, such as spending the winter of 1840 in Cuba, but nevertheless, he died in 1842 in Cincinnati at the home of his friend S. W. Pomeroy, wracked with arthritis and tuberculosis.  The middle joint of his rheumatic ring finger remains in the possession of the Alpha Delta Phi fraternity as a testament to his courage and willpower.

Samuel Eells was buried in the Eells family plot in Woodland Cemetery in Cleveland, Ohio.

Legacy
Though noteworthy in their time, Eells' works are not widely read today and are treated mostly as historical artifacts.  Alpha Delta Phi, however, is a thriving organization.  It is divided into two branches—the Society, with five chapters and two affiliates, and the all-male Fraternity, with dozens of chapters in the United States and Canada.

References

External links
 
 Biography of Samuel Eells

1810 births
1842 deaths
Hamilton College (New York) alumni
Alpha Delta Phi founders
Writers from Cincinnati
American abolitionists
People from Westmoreland, New York
Activists from Ohio
Activists from New York (state)
Burials at Woodland Cemetery (Cleveland)